Imperial fleet may refer to the fleet (usually the navy) of an empire. Examples include:
 Reichsflotte, the navy of the German Confederacy from 1848 to 1852
 Imperial German Navy (Kaiserliche Marine), the navy of the German Empire from 1871 to 1919
 Imperial Japanese Navy, navy of the Empire of Japan
 Roman navy, navy of the Roman Empire